Rudy Heryanto (born 19 October 1954) is a male Chinese Indonesian former badminton player.

Career

A men's doubles specialist, Heryanto and fellow countrymen Hariamanto Kartono formed one of the world's leading teams between 1980 and 1985. As upstarts they earned silver medals at the 1980 IBF World Championships in Jakarta, losing the final to veteran Indonesian teammates Ade Chandra and Christian Hadinata. At the 1981 All-England Championships they avenged that loss in the semifinal and went on to defeat another venerable Indonesian pair, Tjun Tjun and Johan Wahjudi in the final. They won the All-Englands again in 1984  and the Indonesia Open in 1982 and 1983. In the momentous Thomas Cup series of 1982 (China's debut) they split their matches against China in Indonesia's narrow 4—5 final round loss. After the partnership broke up, Heryanto won the Thailand Open with Bobby Ertanto in 1985.

Achievements

IBF World Championships 
Men's Doubles

World Cup 
Men's doubles

World Games 
Men's doubles

Southeast Asian Games 
Men's doubles

International Tournaments 
Men's doubles

Mix's doubles

References

1954 births
Living people
Indonesian male badminton players
World Games medalists in badminton
World Games bronze medalists
Competitors at the 1981 World Games
Asian Games medalists in badminton
Asian Games gold medalists for Indonesia
Asian Games silver medalists for Indonesia
Badminton players at the 1982 Asian Games
Badminton players at the 1978 Asian Games
Medalists at the 1978 Asian Games
Medalists at the 1982 Asian Games
Southeast Asian Games medalists in badminton
Southeast Asian Games gold medalists for Indonesia
Competitors at the 1981 Southeast Asian Games
People from Tasikmalaya
Sportspeople from West Java